</ref>

Variants

The two-document hypothesis emerged in the 19th century: Mark as the earliest gospel, Matthew and Luke written independently and reliant on both Mark and the hypothetical Q.
In 1924 B. H. Streeter refined the two-document hypothesis into the four-document hypothesis based on the possibility of a Jewish M source (see the Gospel according to the Hebrews).

While the standard two-source theory holds Mark and Q to be independent, some argue that Q was also a source for Mark. This is sometimes called the Modified two-document hypothesis (although that term was also used in older literature to refer to the Four-document hypothesis).

A number of scholars have suggested a Three-source hypothesis, that Luke actually did make some use of Matthew after all. This allows much more flexibility in the reconstruction of Q.

Dunn proposes an Oral Q hypothesis, in which Q is not a document but a body of oral teachings.

Other hypotheses
Some form of the Two Source hypothesis continues to be preferred by a majority of New Testament scholars as the theory that is best able to resolve the synoptic problem. Nevertheless, doubts about the problems of the minor agreements and, especially, the hypothetical Q, have produced alternative hypotheses.

In 1955 a British scholar, A. M. Farrer, proposed that one could dispense with Q by arguing that Luke revised both Mark and Matthew. In 1965 an American scholar, William R. Farmer, also seeking to do away with the need for Q, revived an updated version of Griesbach's idea that Mark condensed both Matthew and Luke. In Britain, the most influential modern opponents of the 2SH favor the Farrer hypothesis, while Farmer's revised Griesbach hypothesis, also known as the Two Gospel hypothesis, is probably the chief rival to the Two Source hypothesis in America.

In 1838, the German theologian Christian Gottlob Wilke argued for a solution that combined Marcan priority with an extensively developed argument for Matthew's direct dependence upon both Mark and Luke. Thus, like Farrer, Wilke's hypothesis has no need for Q, but it simply reverses the direction of presumed dependence between Matthew and Luke proposed by Farrer. A few other German scholars supported Wilke's hypothesis in the nineteenth century, but in time most came to accept the two-source hypothesis, which remains the dominant theory to this day. The Wilke hypothesis was accepted by Karl Kautsky in his Foundations of Christianity and has begun to receive new attention in recent decades since its revival in 1992 by Huggins, then Hengel, then independently by Blair. Additional recent supporters include Garrow and Powell.

The traditional view is represented by the Augustinian hypothesis, which is that the four gospels were written in the order in which they appear in the bible (Matthew → Mark → Luke), with Mark a condensed edition of Matthew. This hypothesis was based on the claim by the 2nd century AD bishop Papias that he had heard that Matthew wrote first. By the 18th century the problems with Augustine's idea led Johann Jakob Griesbach to put forward the Griesbach hypothesis, which was that Luke had revised Matthew and that Mark had then written a shorter gospel using material on which both Matthew and Luke agreed (Matthew → Luke → Mark).

A variant of the Augustinian hypothesis, attempting to synchronise Matthew and Mark on the basis of the Mosaic "two witnesses" requirement of Deuteronomy 19:15 (Matthew + Mark → Luke), was proposed by Eta Linnemann, following rejection of the view of her teacher Rudolf Bultmann.

See also
 Biblical criticism
 Historicity of Jesus
 Q+/Papias hypothesis
 Common Sayings Source
 Gospel harmony

Notes and references 

Synoptic problem
Biblical criticism
Christian terminology
Gospel of Mark
Gospel of Matthew
Gospel of Luke